Robert Pérez may refer to:

 Robert Pérez (baseball) (born 1969), baseball player
 Robert Pérez Palou (born 1948), painter